Kanekoa Jacob Texeira (born February 6, 1986) is an American former professional baseball pitcher and the current manager of the Mississippi Braves, the Double-A affiliate of the Atlanta Braves. He played in Major League Baseball (MLB) for the Seattle Mariners and Kansas City Royals.

Biography

Amateur career
Texeira attended the Kamehameha Schools in Honolulu and Saddleback College in Mission Viejo, California.

Professional career

Chicago White Sox
Texeira was selected by the Milwaukee Brewers in the 31st round of the 2004 Major League Baseball Draft. He did not sign.

Texeira was selected by Chicago White Sox in the 22nd round (675th overall) of the 2006 Major League Baseball Draft. He signed on June 14, 2006, and debuted that season with the Bristol White Sox of the Appalachian League, before being promoted to the Kannapolis Intimidators of the South Atlantic League. After pitching all of 2007 in Kannapolis, he split 2008 between the Class-A advanced Winston-Salem Warthogs and the Class-AA Birmingham Barons.

New York Yankees
On November 14, 2008, the White Sox traded Texeira along with first baseman/outfielder Nick Swisher in exchange for infielder Wilson Betemit, and minor league pitchers Jeffrey Marquez and Jhonny Nuñez. He played the 2009 season the Class-AA Trenton Thunder.

Seattle Mariners
Texeira was selected by the Seattle Mariners in the 2009 Rule 5 draft. Mariners General Manager Jack Zduriencik had been familiar with Texeira from his days with the Brewers, where he was scouting director when Texeira was drafted by the Brewers in 2004. Texeira made the Mariners' opening day roster following a strong performance in spring training. With the Mariners, he recorded a 5.30 ERA, 6.8 strikeouts per nine innings, and 4.8 walks per nine innings in  innings pitched. However, Texeira and Jesús Colomé were designated for assignment on May 31, 2010, as the Mariners promoted pitchers Sean White and Garrett Olson.

Kansas City Royals
On June 3, 2010, Texeira was claimed off waivers by the Kansas City Royals, who designated Brad Thompson for assignment to make room for him. On June 15, 2010, he recorded his first career win in a 15–7 Royals victory over the Houston Astros.

Texeira, after starting the 2011 season with Kansas City, was optioned to Triple-A on April 21. He had a 0–0 record with a 2.84 ERA in six games at the time of his demotion. Royals add Coleman to bullpen, send Texeira to the Omaha Storm Chasers. He was designated for assignment on May 18.

Later playing career
Texeira was claimed off waivers by the New York Yankees on May 25. He was released by the Yankees on July 6, after making six appearances with the Triple-A Scranton/Wilkes-Barre Yankees, recording a 22.85 ERA. On July 20, he re-signed a minor league contract with the Yankees.

Texiera made his AA season debut for the Trenton Thunder of the Eastern League on August 5, 2011. After 1.1 innings, he was pulled after giving up 6 hits for 4 runs (an ERA of 20.25), striking one out, and walking another. The Thunder went on to lose to the Altoona Curve, 8–2. Since then, he has reduced his ERA, making continued progress until a slight setback on August 13, 2011. Appearing with an ERA down to 8.10 in a game at Harrisburg, PA with the Thunder leading 7–3 in the ninth, Chris McConnell of the Senators led off the ninth with a solo homer. Settling in, Texeira closed out the ninth and now has an ERA standing at 8.31.

Texeira was signed to a minor league contract by the Cincinnati Reds on December 15, 2011. Texeira signed a contract to pitch for the Bridgeport Bluefish of the Atlantic League of Professional Baseball. He was named to the 2013 Atlantic League All Star team. On July 4, 2013, the Reds purchased the contract of Texeira from the Bridgeport Bluefish. He will report to Triple A Louisville of the International League. Texeira signed with the Bluefish for the 2014 season.

On June 23, 2014, Texeira signed a minor league deal with the Atlanta Braves. On June 24, 2014, he was assigned to AAA Gwinnett Braves.

Coaching career
Texiera was named as the pitching coach for the rookie level Danville Braves in the Atlanta Braves organization for the 2017 and 2018 seasons. He was promoted to pitching coach of the Class A Rome Braves for the 2019 season. In March 2021, he was named as the manager of the Rome Braves, the Class A-Advanced affiliate of the Atlanta Braves. Before the 2023 minor league season began, Texeira was named manager of the Double-A Mississippi Braves.

Personal life
Texeira is the cousin of former MLB outfielder Shane Victorino.

References

External links

1986 births
Living people
American people of Portuguese descent
People from Maui
Baseball coaches from Hawaii
Baseball players from Hawaii
Major League Baseball pitchers
Seattle Mariners players
Kansas City Royals players
Bristol White Sox players
Kannapolis Intimidators players
Winston-Salem Warthogs players
Birmingham Barons players
Trenton Thunder players
Omaha Storm Chasers players
Gulf Coast Yankees players
Saddleback Gauchos baseball players
Scranton/Wilkes-Barre Yankees players
Louisville Bats players
Bridgeport Bluefish players
Honolulu Sharks players
Indios de Mayagüez players
Gwinnett Braves players
Minor league baseball coaches